Siuri may refer to:

Siuri, Nepal
Suri, Birbhum, India